The Sportplatz Rheinau is a football stadium in Balzers, Liechtenstein. It is the home of FC Balzers, and has a capacity of 2,000.

References

Football venues in Liechtenstein
Sport in Balzers
FC Balzers